Harvel Township (T11N W½R4) is located in Montgomery County, Illinois, United States. As of the 2010 census, its population was 243 and it contained 124 housing units.

Geography

Demographics

Adjacent townships
 Bois D'Arc Township (northwest & north)
 King Township, Christian County (northeast & east)
 Raymond Township (southeast & south)
 Zanesville Township, Montgomery County (southwest)
 Pitman Township (west)

References

External links
City-data.com
Illinois State Archives
Historical Society of Montgomery County

Townships in Montgomery County, Illinois
1872 establishments in Illinois
Townships in Illinois